The Commonwealth Games has been commemorated in the postage stamps of a number of nations.  Unlike the Olympic Games the first celebrations of the Commonwealth Games did not appear on stamps.  The first Commonwealth Games stamps were issued in connection with the Games in Cardiff in 1958, although there were philatelic labels issued for Games prior to 1958.

1934 London

 New Zealand, 1990, SG 1559 (shows Jack Lovelock running in the 1934 British Empire Games)
 New Zealand, 1990, SG MS1561 (mentions the 1934 British Empire Games on the miniature sheet)

1938 Sydney

 Australia, 1938, Philatelic label
 Australia, 1938, 150th anniversary of New South Wales, SG 193-195 (Not Commonwealth Games, but the games were held in conjunction with the 150th anniversary of New South Wales)

1958 Cardiff

 Great Britain, 1958, SG 567-569

1962 Perth

 Australia, 1962, SG 346-347
 Australia, 2006, SG MS2599 (1962 stamps reprinted in miniature sheet in conjunction with 2006 Commonwealth Games)
 Papua & New Guinea, 1962, SG 39-41

1966 Kingston

 Jamaica, 1966, SG 254-257, MS258
 Kenya Uganda Tanzania, 1966, SG 227-230

1970 Edinburgh

 Calf of Man, 1970, British local issue not listed in Stanley Gibbons (set of 5 values and Miniature Sheet)
 Gambia, 1970, SG 262-264
 Great Britain, 1970, SG 832-834
 Kenya Uganda Tanzania, 1970, SG 280-283
 Malawi, 1970, SG 351-354, MS355
 Swaziland, 1970, SG 180-183

1974 Christchurch

 Cook Islands, 1974, SG 455-459, MS460
 Fiji, 1974, SG 489-491
 New Zealand, 1974, SG 1041-1045, MS1046 
 Samoa, 1974, SG 422-425
 Tonga, 1974, SG 469-478, O109-O111

1978 Edmonton

 Canada, 1978, SG 908-909, 918-921
 Isle of Man, 1978, SG 140
 Kenya, 1978, SG 127-130
 Tonga, 1978, SG 665-665, O163-O165
 Turks & Caicos Islands. 1978, SG 509-512, MS513
 Uganda, 1978, SG 210-213, MS214
 Uganda, 1979, SG 263-266 (Commonwealth Games set overprinted "Uganda Liberated 1979")

1982 Brisbane

 Anguilla, 1982, SG 530-533
 Ascension Island, 1982, SG 326-327
 Australia, 1982, SG 859-862, MS863
 Australia, 1982, SG MS863 (overprinted with "ANPex 82 National Stamp Exhibition 1982" on non-stamp portion of Miniature Sheet)
 Australia, 1982, Aerogram with printed stamp
 Australia, 2006, SG MS2599b 1982 stamps reprinted in Miniature Sheet in conjunction with 2006 Commonwealth Games
 Falkland Islands, 1982, SG 431-432
 Great Britain, 1982, Commemorative Sheet issued for Stampex 82
 Great Britain, 2012, stamp issued as part of Diamond Jubilee set shows the Queen at the Brisbane Games in 1982
 Guyana, 1982, SG 1005
 Kenya, 1984, SG 457
 Papua New Guinea, 1982, SG 460-463
 St Helena, 1982, SG 401-402
 Samoa, 1982, SG 625-628
 Solomon Islands, 1982, SG 473-474, MS476
 Tonga, 1982, SG 823-824
 Tristan da Cunha, 1982, SG 335-336

1982 Commonwealth Table Tennis Championships, Bombay

 India, 1980, SG 967

1986 Edinburgh

 Eynhallow, 1986, British local issue not listed in Stanley Gibbons (set of 2 values)
 Great Britain, 1986, SG 1328-1331
 Guernsey, 1986, SG 371-376
 Isle of Man, 1986, SG 306-309
 Kenya, 1986, stamps prepared but not issued. (A few rural post offices did issue the stamps, so used examples of the 1/- value have been seen. One mint set of all 5 values is known in the collection of a German stamp collector.)
 Tonga, 1986, SG 948-949

1990 Auckland

 New Zealand, 1989, SG 1530-1537, MS1538
 Tanzania, 1990, SG 817-820, MS821
 Tonga, 1990, SG 1065-1069

1994 Victoria

 Canada, 1994, SG 1590-1595
 Hong Kong, 1994, SG 783-786
 Nauru, 1994, SG 421

1998 Kuala Lumpur

 Fiji, 1998, SG 1026-1029, MS1030
 Malaysia, 1994, SG 548-549
 Malaysia, 1995, SG 575-576
 Malaysia, 1996, SG 627-630
 Malaysia, 1997, SG 668-671
 Malaysia, 1998, SG MS678
 Malaysia, 1998, SG 693-708, MS709
 Malaysia, 1998, SG MS715/MS716
 Malaysia, 1998, Aerogram with printed stamp
 Malaysia, 1998, pre-printed envelope for closing ceremony
 Nauru, 1998, SG 483-486, MS487
 Norfolk Island, 1998, SG 679-681, MS682
 Papua New Guinea, 1998, SG 841-844

2002 Manchester

 Australia, 2002, Aerogram with printed stamp
 British Virgin Islands, 2003, SG 1116-1117
 Great Britain, 2002, SG 2299-2303
 Isle of Man, 2002, SG 976-981
 Norfolk Island, 2002, SG 809-812
 Pabay, 2002, British Local Issue not listed by Stanley Gibbons (3 values in a Miniature Sheet)
 St Kitts, 2002, SG 718-719 (stamps feature Kim Collins)
 Samoa, 2003, SG 1126 (stamp shows Beatrice Faumuina, the Commonwealth Games Discus champion from New Zealand)
 Tonga, 2002, SG 1523-1526

2006 Melbourne

 Australia, 2005, SG 2522 (stamp issued for the Queen's 79th Birthday, featured Commonwealth Games logo)
 Australia, 2006, SG 2575, 2596-2598, MS2599, MS2599c, 2600 
 Australia, 2006, SG MS2607 (Opening Ceremony Miniature Sheet)
 Australia, 2006, SG MS2608-MS2621 (14 miniature sheets featuring Australian Gold Medal winners)
 Australia, 2006, SG MS2622 (Closing Ceremony Miniature Sheet)
 Australia, 2006, SG MS2623 ("Most Memorable Moment" Miniature Sheet (Women's Marathon))
 Norfolk Island, 2006, SG 946-947 (Commonwealth Games Baton arrival in Norfolk Island)
 Norfolk Island, 2006, SG 948-950
 Uganda, 2007, SG 2669-2670 two stamps issued as part of the set for Commonwealth Heads of Government Meeting in Kampala, featuring Ugandan athletes at the 2006 Commonwealth Games, namely Dorcus Inzikuru, the gold-medallist in the women’s steeplechase, and Boniface Toroitich Kiprop the gold-medallist in the men’s 10,000 metres
 Samoa, 2007, SG 1201, MS1204 (featuring Ele Opeloge, the Commonwealth Games Women's Weightlifting Champion from Samoa)

2008 Pune (Commonwealth Youth Games)

 India, 2008, 4 stamps and Miniature Sheet SG 2509-2512, MS2513

2010 Delhi

 Australia, 2006, miniature sheet SG MS2622 stamps feature Delhi 2010 contribution to the Melbourne Commonwealth Games closing ceremony
 Gibraltar, 2010, miniature sheet issued 20 October 2010
 Guernsey, 2010, stamps issued 23 September 2010
 India, 2008, stamp and miniature sheet SG 2516 miniature sheet not listed by Stanley Gibbons
 India 2010, 2 stamps and miniature sheet SG 2723-2724, MS2725
 India 2010, 2 stamps and miniature sheet SG 2735-2736, MS2737
 India 2010, 4 stamps and miniature sheet issued 3 October 2010
 Mozambique, 2010, 8 stamps and miniature sheet issued 30 November 2010
 Papua New Guinea, 2010, set of four stamps and miniature sheet issued 3 September 2010

2011 Isle of Man (Commonwealth Youth Games)

 Isle of Man, 2011, miniature sheet issued 19 August 2011

2014 Glasgow

 Sri Lanka, 2007, 2 stamps SG 1920-1921 (issued for CGF General Assembly held in Sri Lanka in 2007, where the Games were awarded to Glasgow in 2014)
 Sri Lanka, 2013, 4 stamps (issued for the Glasgow 2014 Queen's Baton Relay visit to Sri Lanka; these however are "personalized stamps" which are valid for postage, but not issued to the general public)

2018 Gold Coast

 St Kitts, 2011, 1 stamp (issued for CGF General Assembly held in St Kitts in 2011, where the Games were awarded to Gold Coast in 2018)

See also

References

Stamps
Stamps
Sport on stamps
Lists of postage stamps